Robert Small may refer to:

 Robert Small (minister) (1732–1808), Scottish minister, Moderator of the General Assembly of the Church of Scotland, mathematician and astronomer
 Robert Small (producer), American entertainment producer
 Robert Small (trade unionist) (1873–1918), Scottish trade unionist and socialist activist
 Robert Hardy Small (1891–1976), Canadian politician, Member of Parliament for Danforth

See also
 Robert Smalls (1839–1915), freed slave and United States politician